Kurt Heegner was a German mathematician
Heegner points are special points on elliptic curves
The Stark–Heegner theorem identifies the imaginary quadratic fields of class number 1.
A Heegner number is a number n such that Q() is an imaginary quadratic field of class number 1.